Charles William Tatum (23 July 1926 – 22 June 2014) was an American World War II veteran, Bronze Star recipient, race car driver and builder. On 19 February 1945, he was among the first wave of marines to land on the Japanese island stronghold of Iwo Jima. He was a friend of John Basilone.

Tatum's war memoir, Red Blood, Black Sand, was one of five books used as source material for the Steven Spielberg and Tom Hanks produced HBO miniseries The Pacific. Tatum is portrayed in the series by actor Ben Esler.

Biography

Military service
Tatum enlisted in the U.S. Marine Corps when he was 17. He became a machine gunner and was sent to the newly activated 5th Marine Division at Camp Pendleton, California in 1944. There he became acquainted during training (and on Iwo Jima) with Medal of Honor recipient, Gunnery Sergeant John Basilone ("Manila John"), a machine gun section leader who was killed in action the first day on Iwo Jima and awarded the Navy Cross posthumously.

Tatum was sent for further training with the 5th Division at Camp Tarawa near Hilo, Hawaii, which was preparing for the assault and capture of Iwo Jima. He was a member of Baker ("B") Company, 1st Battalion, 27th Marine Regiment, 5th Marine Division.

On 19 February 1945 (D-Day), his battalion (Landing Team 1-27) disembarked and landed on "Red Beach 2", on the southeast side of Iwo Jima, off of landing boats from the attack transport, with orders to, "land, seize, and occupy Iwo Jima" ("Island X").

Tatum landed with the Marine infantry and their attached Navy medical corpsmen in LVTs (amtracs; amphibian tractors) from LST #10 that they had boarded 11 February when the USS Hansford stopped at Saipan. "Red Beach 2", a 550-yard landing zone, was about 800 yards across from Motoyama Airfield #1, which in turn was 1,500 yards north of Mount Suribachi on the south end of Iwo Jima. "Red Beach 2" was one of the seven color named and numbered landing zones that combined were two miles long on the east side of Iwo Jima.

Tatum was awarded the Bronze Star Medal with "V" device for saving a buddy, Steve Evanson, during fighting at Hill 362 on Iwo Jima (Evanson nevertheless died the next day). Tatum was subsequently wounded in action and evacuated from the island.

Career
Tatum became a successful race car driver and builder after the war. His son, Blake Tatum, drove a Crusader that was manufactured by his father's company to become the 1994 Formula Vee West Coast Regional Champion.

Tatum was active in Marine affairs and was twice the president of the Stockton Marine Corps Club in California. In 1995, he arranged a memorial service in Washington D.C. in recognition of the 50th anniversary of the Battle of Iwo Jima.

Tatum's book, Red Blood, Black Sand, first printed in 1995, is one of the five books used as a basis for the television mini-series The Pacific; Tatum is portrayed by actor Ben Esler.

References

External links

1926 births
2014 deaths
United States Marine Corps personnel of World War II
Battle of Iwo Jima
Sportspeople from Tulsa, Oklahoma
Sportspeople from Stockton, California
United States Marines
Writers from Tulsa, Oklahoma